Nancy Anne Temple is an attorney specializing in accounting liability. She was the in-house attorney for Arthur Andersen, who advised Michael Odom and David B. Duncan about Arthur Andersen policies regarding retention of documents from client engagements. Duncan oversaw the shredding of Arthur Andersen documents concerning their work for client Enron, between October 22 and November 9, 2001 (See the Timeline of the Enron scandal). A memo from Nancy Temple played a key role in the conviction of Arthur Andersen on charges of obstruction of justice. That conviction was later overturned.

Pre-Andersen 

Nancy Temple graduated from the University of Illinois College of Business in 1986 with a Bachelor of Science in Accountancy.
After graduation, Ms. Temple attended Harvard Law School where she graduated with a Juris Doctor in 1989.
She began her career at Sidley Austin Brown & Wood, now known as Sidley Austin.  She worked at the law firm for 11 years and was inducted as a partner.  Ms. Temple specialized in accounting liability.

Arthur Andersen conviction overturned

On May 31, 2005, the United States Supreme Court overturned the conviction of Arthur Andersen in a unanimous decision.

Chief Justice William H. Rehnquist, writing for the court, said the former Big Five accounting firm's obstruction-of-justice conviction was improper because the instructions at trial were too vague for jurors to determine correctly whether Andersen obstructed justice. "'[T]he jury instructions at issue simply failed to convey the requisite consciousness of wrongdoing," he wrote. "[I]t is striking how little culpability the instructions required."

In post-conviction interviews, several of the Arthur Andersen jurors indicated that the "guilty" verdict was proximately based upon an internal October 16, 2001 email from in-house Arthur Andersen attorney Nancy Temple. The text of the email from Nancy Temple is as follows:

The Supreme Court's unanimous reversal of the conviction reinforces the opinion that the jury should not have inferred any liability on Arthur Andersen based solely upon the October 16 memo. Rather, Ms. Temple's bar license required that she not do anything that would waive the "attorney-client" privilege of Enron or Arthur Andersen. By having her name and a legal reference removed, in effect she was making the subject memo suitable for public disclosure – it was no longer a "privileged" document.

In addition, public accounting firms had a duty to notify the SEC within a defined time window if the accountants disagreed with a public accounting filing by a client. Ms. Temple's memo notes that the subject matter at issue was determined not to be of a nature that would require that Arthur Andersen to notify the SEC - i.e., a "Section 10A" filing, and her memo indicates that she will consult with the lawyers – again – to verify that conclusion.

Post-Andersen 

Nancy Temple is now married and has three sons.
After the Arthur Andersen case, Ms. Temple began working for Freeman, Freeman & Salzman P.C., a currently defunct law firm.
On April 1, 2008, Ms. Temple returned to practice law at Katten & Temple LLP, a firm she co-founded.  The firm specializes in litigation.

References 

Year of birth missing (living people)
Living people
Gies College of Business alumni
Harvard Law School alumni
Enron scandal
American women lawyers
21st-century American women